The Acer beTouch E400  is a smartphone manufactured by Acer Inc. of Taiwan. With this smartphone the company opted to go Android 2.1 (Éclair) and abandon the Windows Mobile 6.5 used in the first beTouch smartphones released starting October 2009. The Acer beTouch E400 was officially announced at the Mobile World Congress in February 2010.

Main features 
The E400 is powered by the 600 MHz Qualcomm QSX 7227 CPU and runs the older Android 2.1 Eclair. It has an 81mm (3.2-inch) touchscreen, a camera without flash, Wi-Fi, geo-tagging, digital zoom, scene modes, white balance, color effects and a simple macro mode. This phone is also able to record video and upload it to YouTube. 
It supports Native Microsoft Exchange Server and a Shareware "Documents To Go" application that can edit and create Microsoft Word documents, Excel and PowerPoint and Adobe PDF.

The beTouch E400 comes preinstalled with Acer Sync, a smart application that allows automatic cloud-based and Wi-Fi synchronization with netbook, notebook or desktop.

See also
List of Android devices
Galaxy Nexus

References

External links
 Acer Smartphone overview
 Acer beTouch E400 Official Site

beTouch E400
Android (operating system) devices
Mobile phones introduced in 2009